Victor Earnest Rillieux (1842 – 1898) was an American blind Creole of color songwriter, poet, playwright and businessman. He is known for having written more than any other contemporary Louisianan although few of his works remain. He wrote many poems about contemporary civil rights activists, including Ida B. Wells and the ex-Confederate Black civil rights advocate P. G. T. Beauregard.

Life and Family
Rillieux was born in New Orleans, Louisiana to a distinguished Creole family that provided many services to its community. One of his cousins was Norbert Rillieux, an inventor who created sugar refining equipment. Rillieux died on December 5, 1898.

References

19th-century American poets
American male poets
French-language poets
American people of French descent
Writers from New Orleans
Louisiana Creole people
1898 deaths
1842 births